Washington Township is one of twelve townships in Jackson County, Indiana, United States. As of the 2010 census, its population was 1,122 and it contained 434 housing units.

Geography
The stream of Horse Lick runs through this township.

Unincorporated towns
 Dudleytown

Extinct towns
 Chestnut Ridge

Adjacent townships
 Jackson Township (north)
 Spencer Township, Jennings County (northeast)
 Marion Township, Jennings County (east)
 Vernon Township (southeast)
 Grassy Fork Township (southwest)
 Brownstown Township (west)

Cemeteries
The township contains one cemetery, Chestnut Ridge.

Major highways
  Interstate 65
  Indiana State Road 11
  Indiana State Road 250

References
 U.S. Board on Geographic Names (GNIS)
 United States Census Bureau cartographic boundary files

External links
 Indiana Township Association
 United Township Association of Indiana

Townships in Jackson County, Indiana
Townships in Indiana